"Paprika" (パプリカ) is a song by the children choral group Foorin. NHK invited Kenshi Yonezu to produce it as a cheer song for the 2020 Summer Olympics.

Background and release
This song was performed at the 69th NHK Kōhaku Uta Gassen with Okaasan to Issho, Inai Inai Baa!, Seiko Matsuda, King & Prince, Sexy Zone, AKB48, Nogizaka46, and Keyakizaka46.

The CD of Japanese version was released on August 15, 2018. The MV of English version by Foorin Team E was released through YouTube on December 1, 2019, while CD was released on January 22, 2020. The MV of Kenshi version was released on August 9, 2019, and was available as a digital single on February 3, 2020.

The choreographers are Tomohiko Tsujimoto and Koharu Sugawara.

Reception
The Japanese version debuted at No.18, peaked at No.3 in January 2020 and charted in the Oricon singles chart for more than 100 weeks. The song won the Grand Prix award at the 61st Japan Record Awards on December 30, 2019, becoming the first children's group to receive the award.

Track listing

Charts

Weekly charts

Year-end charts
JP ver

Accolades

References

2018 singles
Kenshi Yonezu songs
Japanese children's songs
Minna no Uta
Animated music videos
Olympic theme songs